Herby Fortunat (born 28 June 1982) is a Congolese former professional footballer who played as a forward.

Club career
Born in Port-au-Prince, Haiti, Fortunat was raised in France. He began his professional career with FC Sochaux-Montbéliard at age 18, but never played for the club's first team. He would play in the Championnat de France amateur and Swiss Challenge League before signing with Albanian Superliga side Besa Kavajë in 2005. After scoring ten goals for Besa, he signed with Championnat National side L'Entente SSG in July 2006.

On 29 January 2013, Fortunat signed with KF Tirana for an undisclosed fee. He was presented to the media in the next day.

International career
Fortunat played twice for the France U16 national team before opting to play for the senior Congo national team in 2006. He made three appearances for Congo-Brazzaville.

References

External links 
 
 
 

1982 births
Living people
Sportspeople from Port-au-Prince
Republic of the Congo footballers
Haitian footballers
France youth international footballers
Republic of the Congo international footballers
Association football forwards
Haitian emigrants to France
Championnat National 2 players
Swiss Challenge League players
Kategoria Superiore players
US Joué-lès-Tours players
CO Châlons players
FC Bulle players
SC Young Fellows Juventus players
Besa Kavajë players
Entente SSG players
Can Tho FC players
KF Tirana players
Republic of the Congo expatriate footballers
Republic of the Congo expatriate sportspeople in Switzerland
Expatriate footballers in Switzerland
Republic of the Congo expatriate sportspeople in Albania
Expatriate footballers in Albania
GBK Kokkola players